Julius Pinschewer (15 September 1883 Inowroclaw – 16 April 1961 Berne) was a German film producer who specialised in advertising films.

During the First World War, he recognised the potential of propagandistic film use and produced several films advertising war bonds.

In 1930 he married Charlotte Wohlgemuth with whom he had two children.

Films

References

1883 births
1961 deaths
Jewish emigrants from Nazi Germany to Switzerland